In enzymology, a methenyltetrahydromethanopterin cyclohydrolase is an enzyme that catalyzes the chemical reaction

5,10-methenyl-5,6,7,8-tetrahydromethanopterin + H2O  5-formyl-5,6,7,8-tetrahydromethanopterin

Thus, the two substrates of this enzyme are 5,10-methenyl-5,6,7,8-tetrahydromethanopterin and H2O, whereas its product is 5-formyl-5,6,7,8-tetrahydromethanopterin.

This enzyme belongs to the family of hydrolases, those acting on carbon-nitrogen bonds other than peptide bonds, specifically in cyclic amidines.  The systematic name of this enzyme class is 5,10-methenyltetrahydromethanopterin 10-hydrolase (decyclizing). Other names in common use include 5,10-methenyltetrahydromethanopterin cyclohydrolase, N5,N10-methenyltetrahydromethanopterin cyclohydrolase, and methenyl-H4MPT cyclohydrolase.  This enzyme participates in folate biosynthesis.

References

 

EC 3.5.4
Enzymes of unknown structure